Francisco Veloso (born 1969) is a Portuguese academic. He is the dean of the Imperial College Business School.

Early life and education
Francisco Veloso was born in 1969 in Lisbon, Portugal. He graduated from the University of Lisbon, where he earned a bachelor's degree and a master's degree. In 2001, he earned a PhD from the Massachusetts Institute of Technology.

Career
Veloso began his career as an assistant professor at Carnegie Mellon University in 2002, where he became a full professor in 2011. He was a professor at the Católica Lisbon School of Business & Economics in 2011, and he was the dean from 2012 to August 2017, when he became the dean of the Imperial College Business School.

Veloso has published research on the car industry and start-up spin-offs.

References

Living people
1969 births
People from Lisbon
University of Lisbon alumni
Massachusetts Institute of Technology alumni
Academics of Imperial College London
Portuguese academics
Business school deans
Portuguese academic administrators